111 First Street. From Paris to Jersey City, they showed no love. is a 2012 documentary film, directed by Branko, starring some of the artists of an Art Center and residence located at 111 First Street, Jersey City, New Jersey. It is the fifth feature-length documentary film created by independent filmmaker Branko.

Synopsis
111 First Street in Jersey City, New Jersey is the location of a proposed 52-story skyscraper. The former building housed on the site was a renovated warehouse that housed over 100 artists' studios, including painters, sculptors, photographers, musicians, filmmakers, writers, poets, and others.  The concentration of artists led the building to be known as the "Heart of the Art Center". Although the building (and its occupants) are gone now, 111 First Street..., filmed before the demolition of the original building, documents this group of artists.

Additional appearances

 American Watercolor Movement
 George Aviles, Esq.
 Maria Benjumeda
 Thomas A. deGise, Hudson County Executive
 Nayra de Souza
 Damn Glad
 Joelma, samba dancer
 Bernard Kenny, New Jersey State Senator
 Bill Kraus
 Manhattan Samba
 Tris McCall, music critic, pop musician, writer
 Bob Menendez, U.S. Senator
 Bret Schundler
 Teco, skating champion
 Cesar Vuksic, pianist

References

External links
 
 Movie trailer at Internet Movie Database
 111 First Street Arts Center 
 
 Corey W. McDonald (October 14, 2017) '111 1st Street' exhibition features work from Jersey City warehouse, artist enclave 12 years later | NJ.com

2012 films
Documentary films about the arts
Films shot in New Jersey
Films set in Jersey City, New Jersey
American documentary films
2012 documentary films
Culture of Jersey City, New Jersey
2010s English-language films
2010s American films